Callum Tripp (born August 2006) is an English professional footballer who plays as a midfielder for  club Milton Keynes Dons.

Career
Tripp was an unused substitute for Milton Keynes Dons at the age of fifteen. He started a two-year scholarship at the start of the 2022–23 campaign. Head coach Liam Manning said that he had "high potential" and "terrific character". He made his first-team debut on 30 August 2022, coming on as a half-time substitute in a 2–1 defeat to Cheltenham Town in an EFL Trophy fixture at the Stadium MK.

Career statistics

References

2006 births
Living people
English footballers
Association football midfielders
Milton Keynes Dons F.C. players
English Football League players